Betrayal is a 1932 British crime film directed by Reginald Fogwell and starring Stewart Rome, Marjorie Hume and Leslie Perrins. A woman attempts to save her husband from being hanged for a crime he didn't commit. It is based on a play No Crime of Passion by Hubert G. Griffith.

Cast
 Stewart Rome as John Armytage
 Marjorie Hume as Diana Armytage
 Leslie Perrins as Clive Wilson
 Henry Hewitt as Sir Robert Blackburn KC
 J. Fisher White as John Lawrence KC
 Frank Atherley as Judge
 E. H. Williams as- Butler
 Charles Childerstone as Doctor

References

External links
 

1932 films
British crime films
1932 crime films
Films directed by Reginald Fogwell
British films based on plays
British black-and-white films
Films shot at Rock Studios
1930s English-language films
1930s British films